Ghostly Encounters is a Canadian paranormal documentary television series that premiered on  to January 19, 2011. on Viva/W Network. The program also aired on A&E's The Biography Channel, and currently airs on Discovery's Destination America, both in the United States. The show was created by executive producer Phyllis Platt, is produced by Brian Dennis, and is hosted by Lawrence Chau.

The program uses a combination of interviews and dramatic recreations, examining the events that led its subjects to accept or reject occurrences as supernatural, and how the experience has helped or hindered them.

Ghostly Encounters won a Gemini Award for best original score in 2007.

Format
Each episode usually tells stories from two individuals who believe they have had paranormal experiences. When warranted, however, the show will break from this format and instead use the full episode for one story. Each episode is created using a direct-to-camera interview with the storyteller, dramatic re-enactments, and host segments and commentary.  An abandoned ballroom on the top floor of the King Edward Hotel in Toronto provides  the location for the portion of the program featuring host Lawrence Chau.

The episodes begin with a tease, briefly describing the two stories. The tease is followed by the opening credits, which are accompanied by the theme music. After the credits, the first story is introduced using a clip of the subject's interview. The first host segment follows and introduces the theme of the episode, as well as the first story, to the viewers.  The first subject's story is then told using a combination of his or her interview and dramatic re-enactment footage.  Occasionally, b-roll and stock footage are also used in telling the story. At the end of the first story, a brief host segment wraps up the first subject and introduces the second subject of the episode. The second story follows the same format as the first and ends again with a wrap-up from the host. At the same time, the host also wraps up the show and includes final comments on the stories and theme of the episode based on the commentary from the experts. The show ends with a final comment from each subject, usually reflecting on the lesson their encounter has given them, followed by the closing credits.

Episodes

Season 1 (2005)

Season 2 (2006)

Season 3 (2009)

Season 4 (2010)

See also
List of ghost films

References

External links
 
  by Viva
 
 Ghostly Encounters at The Biography Channel
 

2005 Canadian television series debuts
The Biography Channel shows
Canadian television docudramas
Paranormal television
Television series about ghosts
2000s Canadian documentary television series